Carijoa is a genus of soft corals in the family Clavulariidae.

Species
The World Register of Marine Species includes the following species in the genus:

Carijoa multiflora  (Laackman, 1909)
Carijoa operculata  (Bayer, 1961)
Carijoa riisei  (Duchassaing & Michelotti, 1860)
Carijoa rupicola  Mueller, 1867

References

Octocorallia genera
Clavulariidae